Dmitriy Martynov (born November 21, 1991) is a Russian actor. His breakthrough came in Night Watch, where he starred as Yegor.

Filmography

Films
Night Watch (2004) as Yegor (credited as Dmitri Martynov)
Day Watch (2006) as Yegor (credited as Dima Martynov)

Television
The Talisman of Love (2005)

External links

Russian male child actors
Russian male film actors
1991 births
Living people